Đorđe Detlinger was a Serbian footballer.

Playing career
Born in Belgrade, he played with SK Jugoslavija and FK BASK in the Yugoslav Championship. He continues playing with BASK in the 1939–40 Serbian League and 1940–41 Serbian League, scoring a goal in each season.

Coaching career
He coached FK Rudar Kakanj in the season 1960–61 when the club became champion of the Bosnia and Herzegovina Republic League. The title earned them a place in the play-offs for the Yugoslav Second League after losing against Croatian Republic League champions HNK Borovo by 0–8, Detlinger was sacked. He also coached FK Borac Banja Luka.

References

Footballers from Belgrade
Serbian footballers
Yugoslav footballers
Association football forwards
SK Jugoslavija players
FK BASK players
Yugoslav First League players
Serbian football managers
Yugoslav football managers
FK Borac Banja Luka managers
Year of birth missing